The men's heavyweight (91 kg/200.2 lbs) Low-Kick division at the W.A.K.O. European Championships 2006 in Skopje was the second heaviest of the male Low-Kick tournaments involving nine fighters.  Each of the matches was three rounds of two minutes each and were fought under Low-Kick kickboxing rules.

As there were not enough men for a tournament designed for sixteen, seven of the fighters received a bye through to the quarter finals.  The tournament gold medal was won by Dimitri Antonenko from Russia who defeated reigning W.A.K.O. world champion Serbia's Dejan Milosavljevic in the final by split decision.  Sasa Cirovic and Ivan Stanić from Serbia and Croatia had to make do with bronze medals.

Results

Key

See also
List of WAKO Amateur European Championships
List of WAKO Amateur World Championships
List of male kickboxers

References

External links
 WAKO World Association of Kickboxing Organizations Official Site

W.A.K.O. European Championships 2006 (Skopje)